Benevento Calcio Youth Sector comprises the under-19 team and the academy of Italian professional football club Benevento Calcio. The under-19 squad competes in Group B of the Campionato Primavera 2.

Primavera

Current squad

Non-playing staff (under-19 squad)
Director: 
 Head Coach: Nicola Romaniello
 Fitness Coach: Manuel Addona
 Goalkeeping Coach: Antonio Gemma
 Team Doctor: Luca Milano
 Physiotherapist:

Under-17 squad

Non-playing staff (under-17 squad)
Director:
 Head Coach: Pasquale Bovienzo
 Fitness Coach: Alfredo Genco
 Goalkeeping Coach: Pietro Parascandolo
 Team Doctor: Luca Milano
 Physiotherapist: Pasquale Di Mauro

References

External links

Benevento Calcio
Football academies in Italy